Sømænd og svigermødre is a 1962 Danish comedy film directed by Bent Christensen and starring Dirch Passer.

Cast
 Dirch Passer - Kanusti Mogensen
 Ove Sprogøe - Peter Jensen
 Kjeld Petersen - Henry Middelboe
 Jessie Rindom - Emma Middelboe
 Lily Broberg - Tante Rosa
 Lone Hertz - Bitten Middelboe
 Judy Gringer - Yvonne
 Aase Werrild - Fru Kjær
 Svend Methling - Pastor Kræns
 Knud Hilding - Kollega til Henry
 Hardy Rafn - Bageren

External links

1962 films
1960s Danish-language films
1962 comedy films
Films directed by Bent Christensen
Danish black-and-white films
ASA Filmudlejning films
Danish comedy films